is a retired male race walker from Japan. He set his personal best (1:19.29) in the men's 20 km on January 30, 2000, in Kobe.

International competitions

References
 
 
 

1971 births
Living people
Sportspeople from Nagano Prefecture
Japanese male racewalkers
Olympic male racewalkers
Olympic athletes of Japan
Athletes (track and field) at the 2000 Summer Olympics
Asian Games bronze medalists for Japan
Asian Games medalists in athletics (track and field)
Athletes (track and field) at the 2002 Asian Games
Medalists at the 2002 Asian Games
World Athletics Championships athletes for Japan
Japan Championships in Athletics winners